Aeolochroma hypochromaria is a moth of the family Geometridae first described by Achille Guenée in 1858. It is found in Australia (New South Wales and Queensland) and New Caledonia.

Adults have a complex brown and dark green pattern.

Subspecies
Aeolochroma hypochromaria hypochromaria (Australia)
Aeolochroma hypochromaria caledonica Holloway, 1979 (New Caledonia)

References

External links

Pseudoterpnini
Moths described in 1858
Taxa named by Achille Guenée
Moths of Australia